"Songbird" is the second single from Bernard Fanning's solo debut album Tea & Sympathy, released in 2005. It reached #11 on National Airplay Charts in January 2006, and was #14 on Triple J Hottest 100 in 2005.

At the Q Song Awards of 2006, the song won Published song of the Year.

Production

The song was recorded in the first set of sessions for Tea & Sympathy in Peter Gabriel's Bath studio Real World Studios in mid-2005. The song features multi-instrumentalist John Bedggood on violin.

Music video
The music video for "Songbird" was filmed by Head Pictures who previously worked with Fanning on his prior single "Wish You Well" .

Set in a grand Queensland house, the music clip features Fanning playing an acoustic guitar and singing the song facing the camera. Fanning spins on the spot while the camera films the song, however there are several cuts of him doing this in differently coloured rooms with Fanning wearing different clothing in each cut, however assuming the same position from the prior shot, blending each shot seamlessly. Each shot usually lasts about 1–5 seconds, though there are some faster transitions providing a speedy shutter effect.

Charts

References

2005 singles
APRA Award winners
Bernard Fanning songs
Song recordings produced by Tchad Blake
2005 songs